The Japan women's national rugby union team (nicknamed Sakura Fifteen) are a national sporting side of Japan, representing them at rugby union. The side first played in 1991.

History
Japan made their international debut at the 1991 Women's Rugby World Cup. Since then, Japan has appeared at three other editions of the World Cup in 1994, 2002 and 2017. The team has won the Asia Rugby Women's Championship in 2015, 2016 and 2017. 

Japan qualified for the 2021 Rugby World Cup in New Zealand after a revision of Asia's qualification was made due to the global pandemic. As Asia's highest ranked team they qualified automatically for the tournament.

In November 2021, Japan toured Europe and played test matches against Ireland, Scotland and Wales. Wales defeated Japan 23–5, the Sakura's scoring their only try in the 77th minute with a missed conversion. Scotland ran in six tries to give the Sakura's their second loss 36–12, at the DAM Health Stadium in Edinburgh. Ireland down to 14 players pulled off an unlikely win to beat Japan 15–12.

Japan toured Australia in 2022, they played and won matches against Australia, the Australian Barbarians, and Fiji.

Records

Overall

(Full internationals only)

See Women's international rugby for information about the status of international games and match numbering

Rugby World Cup

Players

Recent Squad 
Japan named their final 32-player squad on the 13 September 2022, for the 2021 Rugby World Cup.

Previous Squads

See also

Sport in Japan
Japan national rugby union team

References

External links
Japan RFU Official English page
Japan Times Articles by Rich Freeman -  Japan Times rugby correspondent until 2005, then at the Daily Yomiuri
Japan RFU - in Japanese
Japanese rugby union news from Planet Rugby 

 
 
Asian national women's rugby union teams
1991 establishments in Japan
Rugby clubs established in 1991